The Christian Labour Association of Canada (CLAC) is a labour union that represents companies in the construction, healthcare, and food industries. It was established in 1952 to represent workers on the basis of "Christian social principles". The union claims that its approach to labour relations develops workers' sense of responsibility, participation, stewardship, and dignity. It opposes what it calls the undemocratic, adversarial, and monopolistic practices of the labour movement. It has been characterized by other Canadian trade unions for being a "company union" for its support of employer friendly legislation.

History

Formation
A group of Canadians, many of whom were Dutch immigrants who came to Canada after the Second World War, decided to form a union with principles of dignity, justice, stewardship, and respect, and allowed freedom of association. Those immigrants were accustomed to the European model of labour relations, with freedom of association allowed from a variety of unions to choose from. In Canada, however, people who disagreed with the policies of their union had no option to opt out of the union of their workplace, other than to work in a non-unionized shop. Many non-unionized shops had lower safety and wage standards than unionized shops. A group of those immigrants met on numerous occasions in the early 1950s, and on 20 February 1952, the Christian Labour Association (CLAC) was founded.

Frans Fuykschot was appointed the general secretary of CLAC and opened the union's first office, in Hamilton, Ontario. Soon afterwards, the first issue of The Guide, the official CLAC magazine, was published. Although the founders of CLAC were Christian and wanted their union to be based on Christian social principles, they did not require members to be Christian. Within two years, CLAC started applying for its first certifications.

Early struggles
In 1954 CLAC applied for certifications in British Columbia (BC) and Ontario. The BC Labour Relations Board granted certification to a CLAC local, but the Ontario Labour Relations Board denied certification because of a technicality. However, the Board expressed its concern with the fact that CLAC was based on Christian principles and believed that it would discriminate against non-Christian workers.

After CLAC was granted certification in BC, the AFL–CIO, a labour federation based in the US, threatened CLAC publicly and took job action against CLAC members. Because of the Ontario Labour Board's decision that CLAC's constitution was discriminatory, BC later refused CLAC's recertification application.

CLAC repeatedly tried to gain certification in Ontario and was repeatedly denied on the basis of being discriminatory. In 1959, the union updated their constitution to state specifically that members and applicants did not have to accept the Christian values on which the union was based and that applicants would not be discriminated against for their religion.

CLAC came into conflict with other unions. Workers who were known to be affiliated with CLAC were often harassed and intimidated by members of other unions. Other unions told their members to stop working as soon as CLAC members showed up on a job site.

The pressure from outside the organization led to internal pressures. Some members wanted to take out the language in the constitution that stated that CLAC was based on Christian principles (Article 2). Those arguments led the union to split in 1958, with Fuykschot and several others leaving to establish a new union, the Christian Trade Unions of Canada. The CTUC did not refer to the Bible as its basis in its constitution. The CTUC quickly received certification.

Certification: 1963
Frustrated by the Ontario Labour Board's repeated refusal to recognize CLAC locals, CLAC applied for a judicial review by the Ontario Supreme Court of the refusal to grant certification to CLAC Local 52. In 1963, Chief Justice James Chalmers McRuer issued a decision, disagreeing with the Labour Board's refusal to certify CLAC and saying that the board had erred in three ways. One was in allowing old, irrelevant evidence to be used in making its decision. Another was in misinterpreting the anti-discriminatory statute, thus misapplying it to CLAC. Finally, CLAC certification had been denied without any legal basis. McRuer found that neither CLAC's constitution nor its practices were discriminatory. He ordered the board's decision to be quashed and so CLAC gained the right to certify locals.

Practices and policies
In negotiating wages and benefits for its members, the CLAC considers the "economic viability of the enterprise." The association supports the open shop as an expression of the principle of free association and as a balance between individual and collective interests. It represents more than 58,000 workers under some 550 collective agreements across Canada; more than 15,000 of its workers are in Alberta. The membership is concentrated in Alberta, British Columbia, Manitoba, Ontario, and Saskatchewan, in sectors such as construction, social services, healthcare, emergency services, transportation, retail, education, hospitality, and manufacturing.

The CLAC's members fund a variety of benefit programs such as health and disability insurance, pension and retirement plans, apprenticeship subsidies, training grants, layoff assistance, and a strike fund. The association operates training centres in Alberta, British Columbia, Manitoba, Ontario, and Saskatchewan, which are funded by negotiated education and training funds.

The CLAC has about 200 full-time staff working from 12 regional offices, two benefit administration offices, and its training centres. The Guide, the CLAC's official magazine, is published four times per year.

The CLAC is not affiliated with the Canadian Labour Congress (CLC). Furthermore, it was suspended from the International Trade Union Confederation (ITUC), a global labour organization with affiliates comprising 175 million workers around the world, after the ITUC concluded that "by its published policy and by its activity CLAC indeed undermines labour conditions of workers." CLAC disputed ITUC's reasons for the suspension and noted that it has been certified over 2,000 times by labour boards across Canada. The Court of Queen's Bench for Saskatchewan rejected allegations that CLAC is a "company dominated organization." The suspension came at the request of the CLC, whose affiliated unions compete with the CLAC, and Ken Georgetti, the CLC president, who was also a Vice-President and member of the Executive Board of the ITUC. The CLAC was not granted a hearing before the ITUC's General Council. At its National Convention on 14 September 2012, CLAC delegates voted to resign from the ITUC and join the World Organization of Workers (WOW). The CLAC joined the ITUC in 2006 as a founding member but no longer believes that the ITUC respects union pluralism or workers' right to freedom of association and so it cannot be a reliable partner for international justice for workers.

Services

Training
CLAC operates training centres in BC, Alberta, Saskatchewan, Manitoba, and Ontario. Through the centres, it provides many different types of courses, from industry-specific courses to general courses. CLAC also sends trainers to work sites for company-specific training and operates computer-based courses. It offers scholarships, bursaries, and apprenticeship bursaries.

Career services
CLAC provides career services to help workers find work and employers find workers. It runs the service for members and non-members from its offices in Alberta, BC, Manitoba, Ontario, and Saskatchewan.

Retirement Plans
CLAC runs two retirement savings plans: a pension plan and a Group RSP.

The pension plan was established in 1974 and is available for members across Canada. It is a registered defined contribution plan, which means that contributions are made every month and vested directly in the member. Employers do not have access to the pension fund. The fund is overseen by a Board of Trustees, invested by outside professionals, and audited by an accounting firm.

The Group RSP is run through Great-West Life and is available to members only in Western Canada.

Benefits
CLAC offers numerous group benefit plans, which are run through the Health and Welfare Trust Fund. There are two Benefit Administration offices. Western benefits are handled out of Edmonton, Alberta, Eastern benefits are handled out of Grimsby, Ontario.

The health and welfare benefits provide coverage for needs such as vision, dental, and prescription drugs; life and accidental death and dismemberment insurance; and an employee and family assistance program to help with personal difficulties. Coverage levels vary between collective agreements.

The providers include Standard Life, Sun Life, RBC Insurance, AIG, Green shield, and Ceridian Lifeworks.

Criticism
Some trade unions allege that employers are voluntarily quick to recognize the CLAC because of its willingness to undercut industry-standard wages and working conditions, which other unions have struggled to improve. According to a report from the Canadian Centre for Policy Alternatives, a Canadian based think-tank, CLAC has helped employers in British Columbia circumvent the Employment Standards Act by agreeing to contracts that provide less than the minimums afforded by law because a provision of the Act is that it does not apply to workers represented by a union. In 2018, the Province of British Columbia required construction workers on the Pattullo Bridge project to be members of a construction union within 30 days of the directive, intentionally excluding CLAC. It is alleged that this decision was biased due to the governing NDP political base of labour organizers perceiving CLAC to be a rat union. Additionally, in 2018, an application to the British Columbia Labour Relations Board by Service Employees International Union regarding the employer-driven recognition of CLAC by Best Service Pros Ltd., which provides janitorial services to public post-secondary educational institutions in British Columbia, resulted in the board ruling against CLAC and nullifying the collective agreement between CLAC and employees.

CLAC is regarded by international trade organizations as a danger to labour unions and a threat to collective action to the benefit of workers. Trade unions often allege that the CLAC is a company union and that many of its provisions are company-oriented and deceptive to workers. CLAC, in response, takes the position that "traditional" unions are to blame for the attacks on themselves.

International work
CLAC has been providing financial aid to workers around the world for 25 through its solidarity locals, which are made up of CLAC by members who are not directly represented by the union but believe in the work that it does. Through the CLAC Foundation, the efforts and ability to aid struggling workers and their families have been expanded. Now, CLAC, its members, signatory companies, and the general public can donate to various causes through the foundation. Projects include providing training for tradespeople in areas hit by natural disasters, supporting the China Labour Bulletin, helping workers in Canada prepare to re-enter the workforce, and raising awareness about the issues affecting workers around the world.

Locals

Construction locals
 Construction Workers Local 6 (CLAC) represents construction workers in south-central and south-western Ontario. It was formed in 1960 as part of CTUC and merged with CLAC in 1979.
 Construction Workers Local 52 (CLAC) represents construction workers in Ontario, primarily north and east of Toronto. It was formed in 1960.
 Construction Workers Local 53 (CLAC) represents construction workers in and around Windsor, Sarnia, Chatham, and London, Ontario. It was formed in 1962.
 Construction Workers Union Local 63 (CLAC) represents construction workers throughout Alberta. It is CLAC's largest local and was formed in 1966. In 2002, Construction Workers Association Local 65 was merged with Local 63.
 General and Allied Workers Union Local 67 (CLAC) represents construction workers in the Lower Mainland of British Columbia. It was formed in 1972 under the name Metal, Transport & Warehouse Employees Association Local No.67.
 Construction and Allied Workers' Union Local 68 (CLAC) represents construction workers in British Columbia. It was formed in 1973.
 Construction Workers Local 150 (CLAC) represents construction workers in Ontario, primarily in St. Catharines. It was formed in 1975.
 Construction Workers Union Local 151 (CLAC) represents construction workers in Saskatchewan. It was formed in 1984 but became dormant in 1992 when the government of Saskatchewan disallowed all unions, except for certain trade unions, from representing workers in the construction industry. Local 151 was re-certified in 2010 once the restrictions were struck down by Bill 80.
 Construction Workers Union Local 152 (CLAC) represents construction workers in Manitoba. It was formed in 1986.

Manufacturing and transportation locals
 Logistics, Manufacturing and Allied Trades Union Local 56 (CLAC) represents transportation and manufacturing workers, primarily in Alberta. It was established in 1964 under the name Edson Truck Drivers and Warehousemen Association No. 56 and Transport, Warehousemen and Allied Trades Association No. 56.
 Transport, Construction and General Employees Association Local 66 (CLAC) primarily represents transportation, warehouse, and dock workers in British Columbia. It was formed in 1971.
 Manufacturing, Transportation & Allied Workers Union Local 519 (CLAC) represents manufacturing workers in Chatham, Ontario. It was formed in 2001.
 British Columbia Transportation and Warehousing Association, Local 402 (CLAC) represents workers in transportation and warehousing in British Columbia. It was formed in 2012.

Healthcare and service locals
 Health Care and Service Employee' Union Local 301 (CLAC) represents healthcare and service workers, and voice-over professionals in Alberta. It was formed in 1983.
 Niagara Health Care and Service Workers Union Local 302 (CLAC) represents healthcare and service workers in the Niagara region. It was formed in 1988.
 Southwestern Ontario Health Care and Service Workers Union local 303 (CLAC) represents healthcare, home care, child care, and service workers, primarily in and around London and Chatham, Ontario. It was formed in 2001.
 Health Care and Service Workers Union Local 304 (CLAC) represents healthcare, home care, and service workers in south-central Ontario. It was formed in 2001.
 Grand River Valley Health Care Employees Union Local 305 (CLAC) represents retirement and nursing home workers in and around Hamilton, Brantford, Cambridge, and Stratford, Ontario. It was formed in 2005.
 Service, Health and Allied Workers Union, Local 501 (CLAC) represents retirement, healthcare, social service, hospitality, manufacturing, and service workers in British Columbia. It was formed in 1975.

Volunteer firefighters locals
 Greater Hamilton Volunteer Firefighters Association Local 911 (CLAC) represents volunteer firefighters in Hamilton. It was formed in 2004.
 Eastern Ontario Volunteer Firefighters Association Local 920 (CLAC) represents volunteer firefighters in Belleville and Quinte West. It was formed in 2005.

Education local
 Education, Service, and Health Care Union Local 306 (CLAC) represents education assistants and custodians near Steinbach and Winkler. It was formed in 2007.
 Independent Educators Association, Local 62 (CLAC)

General local
 General Workers Union Local 504 (CLAC) represents workers in Saskatchewan. It was formed in 2010.

Security local
 Security and Service Workers Union, Local 503 (CLAC) represents security workers in Hamilton, Ontario. It was formed in 1999.

Retiree local
 CLAC Local 1 is a local for CLAC retirees. It was formed in 2012.

References

Footnotes

Bibliography

Further reading

External links

Christian Labour Association of Canada – Web Archive created by the University of Toronto Libraries

 
Companies based in Mississauga
Christian trade unions
Trade unions established in 1952